Antrum (also known as Antrum: The Deadliest Film Ever Made) is a 2018 Canadian horror film written and directed by David Amito and Michael Laicini. The film is divided into two parts: an opening and closing frame narrative in the form of a mockumentary and a feature film. The documentary purports to tell the story of Antrum, a movie released in the late 70s that supposedly has deleterious effects on those who watch it; the bulk of the movie is allegedly the only known print of the film, which has itself been altered by an unknown third party.

Antrum was developed by Amito and Laicini, during the development on a separate project, in which they were brainstorming possible scenarios that they could include in the film. The central idea, that would later become the basis for Antrum, came from the concept of what it would be like to watch a purported "cursed" film, which the filmmakers felt would make for a great horror film. For the film's occult aspects, Amito and Laicini studied various historical and cultural depictions of demons and the devil, while further inspiration came from a short film by David B. Earle titled Dining Room or There is Nothing, which Laicini claimed to have seen while in film school. American actress Nicole Tompkins was cast in the lead role of Oralee, while child actor Rowan Smyth was cast in the role of her younger brother Nathan. Principal photography took place in Southern California, over a period of one month.

Antrum made its world premiere at the Brooklyn Horror Film Festival on 14 October 2018, and was screened at other film festivals, where it was nominated for several awards. Uncork’d Entertainment later acquired North American distribution rights to the film, later releasing it via Video-on-Demand and streaming services in Fall 2019. It received positive reviews from critics who praised its atmosphere, acting, and creativity, while some criticized its pacing, runtime, and plot.

Plot

In 1979, a film named Antrum—shot in English but of apparently Bulgarian origin—is submitted for inclusion in a variety of film festivals; none accept it. After each rejection, the various festival directors die under suspicious circumstances. Several years go by during which the film remains unseen until it mysteriously appears at a theater in Budapest in 1988. During the screening, a fire—initially believed to be the result of a faulty projector—burns the theater to the ground. Investigators later determine that audience members set the fire themselves. The film again goes unseen for many years until it is screened in a theater in California in 1993. Prior to the film, a concession stand worker doses popcorn with LSD; the combination of the drug and the film results in a riot during which a pregnant woman is killed. Following this screening, all copies of the film apparently vanish, and it earns a reputation as being cursed.

In 2018, a copy of Antrum surfaces, prompting a documentary crew to make a short film on its history and impact. Although the origins of the movie remain unknown, scientists and film experts who examine the 35 mm reel determine that, among other unique properties, the film utilizes disorienting sounds and subliminal imagery. The documentary crew further determines that unrelated, black-and-white snippets of an apparent snuff film have been spliced into the original movie by a third party. The documentary pauses so that Antrum may be presented in its entirety for the first time in twenty-five years.

Antrum concerns siblings Oralee and Nathan, whose pet dog, Maxine, was recently euthanized. After Nathan asks if Maxine went to Heaven, their mother teases him with saying that because she was a bad dog, Maxine has gone to Hell. In a flashback, it is revealed that Maxine attacked Nathan, for no apparent reason, which resulted in her being euthanized. Traumatized, Nathan begins experiencing disturbing dreams and visions of demons. In an effort to ease his mind, Oralee claims to have obtained a grimoire from an imaginary classmate named Ike whom she claims is versed in the occult. Using the book—in fact, a sketchbook Oralee has filled herself with arcane drawings and "spells"—she takes Nathan to a nearby forest locally renowned as a place for suicides, telling him that it is the place where Satan fell to Earth when he was cast out of Heaven and that if they can find the place where he landed, the pair can dig a hole to Hell and rescue Maxine. Oralee guides Nathan through a series of rituals and "rites," intending all along to arrange for Nathan to discover Maxine's collar in the woods as a "sign" they have saved her soul. As the day progresses, Oralee is disturbed to find that her "spells" are having an apparent effect on the real world, conjuring actual infernal figures. Additionally, the pair accidentally interrupt a man attempting seppuku, and obliviously pass by the rotting corpse of a suicide near their campsite.

Their first night in the woods, Nathan slips out of the tent and sees a boat being rowed in a nearby stream by a figure resembling Charon, who ferries a nude woman. He likewise hears a rattling chain that he attributes to Cerberus. The next day, Nathan and Oralee stumble upon a pair of cannibals in the woods, who capture and cook people alive inside a giant, iron statue of Baphomet, including the man whose suicide attempt they earlier interrupted. When the cannibals become aware of their presence, Oralee attempts to take herself and Nathan to safety by abandoning their camp and rowing downriver in the boat Nathan saw the night before; the pair both end up falling into the water. Oralee and Nathan make it to shore, only to realize they have moved in a circle and are back at their camp. As they hide for the night, Oralee confesses the ruse to Nathan, but he claims to have met Ike. Nathan further tells Oralee that Ike told him not to trust her.

The next morning, the cannibals capture them and attempt to cook Nathan, but Oralee escapes her cage and frees him. As Nathan flees, Oralee obtains a gun and shoots the cannibals to death. In the woods, Nathan stumbles across a dog with its paw caught in a bear trap. Nathan frees the animal, taking it as a sign he has freed Maxine from Hell. A "The End" title card appears onscreen; the film abruptly resumes, following Oralee as she runs through the woods, pursued by demons, and experiencing violent hallucinations. She hides in the pair's tent, aiming her gun at the entrance. As Nathan approaches, a panicked Oralee prepares to fire and the film ends.

The documentary resumes shortly after this, with scholars observing a rune seen throughout the film belonging to a demon named Astaroth; examples of the rune appearing subliminally throughout the film are shown as historians recount tragedies attributed to the demon throughout history.

Cast

 Rowan Smyth as Nathan
 Nicole Tompkins as Oralee
 Dan Istrate as Cassius (First Cannibal)
 Circus-Szalewski as Hanzie (Second Cannibal)
 Shu Sakimoto as Haruki (Victim)
 Kristel Elling as Amber (Mother)
 Lucy Rayner as narrator (Voice)
 Pierluca Arancio as The Demon Amon
 A.J. Bond as himself
 Nathan Fleet as himself
 Brock Fricker as himself
 Assen Gadjalov as himself
Maslam

Production

Development

Antrum was written, produced, and directed by David Amito and Michael Laicini. Development for the film began while Amito and Laicini were working on developing a separate project, which they described as a "horror love story". While working on that film's script, they began brainstorming possible scenarios that they could include in the film, specifically the ones that scared them. As they would later recall in an interview with Rue Morgue, the central idea came from the concept of what it would be like to watch a purported "cursed" film with a history of harming the people who saw it. Feeling that the idea would make an excellent horror film, the filmmakers began developing a screenplay based on the initial concept. In an interview with Rue Morge, both Amito and Laicini stated that the plot of the "cursed film" was deliberately made to appear as if it was "a dark fairy tale", with themes dealing with loss and moral ramifications of belief. Further inspiration came from a short film horror film titled Dining Room or There is Nothing, which Laicini claimed to have viewed while in film school, which left a lasting impression on him. For Antrums occult aspects, Amito, and Laicini studied various historical and cultural depictions of demons and the devil for inspiration, with their shared interests in religious imagery and the supernatural also factoring into the development of the film's script. Most of the symbols and runes depicted in the film were taken from a 17th Century text called Lesser Key of Solomon.

Casting
American actress Nicole Tompkins was cast in the lead role of Oralee. Tompkins had previously starred in the 2016 films Opening Night, and The Amityville Terror. Tompkins was immediately drawn to the role after receiving the film's script during her audition, later recalling: "When I got the material it really clicked for me. I felt like I had something to say and something to bring to the role and apparently, the director’s felt the same because here we are!" Tompkins described her character as being incredibly smart, and creative, with her actions motivated by a strong bond towards her younger brother. American child actor Rowan Smyth, who had previously starred in the Christian drama film I Believe (2017), was cast as Oralee's young brother Nathan.

Filming
Principal photography for Antrum lasted for a period of one month in Southern California, was shot under a low budget with only a handful of production staff working on the film, with Amito later revealing in an interview with Rue Morgue: "We were wildly understaffed, wildly underfunded and unprepared for this month long shoot… yet, somehow a number of elements just magically landed in our lap." Scenes involving Tompkins' and Smyth characters were filmed in a one-hundred acre, privately owned forest, where the filmmakers had been granted special permission to shoot at. Actress Tompkins spoke very positively of her experience working on the film, calling it both challenging and rewarding, and described her working relationship with filmmakers Amito, and Laicini as being very much "in sync" with one another.

Release

Theatrical release
Antrum made its world premiere at the Brooklyn Horror Film Festival on 14 October 2018. It was later screened at the Brussels International Fantastic Film Festival on 18 April 2019. On 1 September 2019, it was screened at the Horrible Imaginings Film Festival. It was a part of the official selection of films at the Sitges Film Festival, with the screening taking place on 1 October 2019. On 1 November 2019, it was screened at the Morbido Film Festival. It was screened at Night Visions International Film Festival, on 20 November 2019.

Home media
It was later announced that Uncork’d Entertainment had acquired North American distribution rights to Antrum, and planned on releasing it via Video-on-Demand and streaming services in Fall 2019.
Antrum was released via Video-on-Demand, and VHS special edition in the United States and Canada on 12 November 2019. Antrum would later become the #1 trending film on Amazon Prime.
It was announced that the film would also be released in Japan in early February 2020, and would later have its home media release there on 7 February.

Reception

Critical response
Critical response for Antrum has been mostly positive, with critics praising the film's unnerving atmosphere, retro 70s style, and blurring the lines between fiction and reality.
Anya Stanley from Dread Central rated the film three out of five stars, writing, "Antrum is a multilayered indulgence of the imagination that uses both internal narrative and a mockumentary structure to blur the line between fiction and reality." Dolores Quintana of Nightmarish Conjurings called it "a film both fascinating and deeply odd that crawls under your skin", praising the film's atmosphere, dreamlike style, cinematography, and performances. Kat Hughes from The Hollywood News awarded the film three out of five stars, praising the film's atmosphere, blurring of fiction and reality, growing sense of unease, and recreation of 1970s style cinema, while criticizing the film's character development. Martin Unsworth from Starburst Magazine gave the film a score of eight out of ten stars, praising the film's plot, performances, soundtrack, visuals, and authentic 70s style, calling it "an unsettling experience". Deirdre Crimmins of Rue Morgue offered the film similar praise, writing, "Tense and unnerving, unpredictable and mean spirited, Antrum: The Deadliest Film Ever Made adds layers to the terrifying power of cinema."

The film was not without its detractors.
On his website, Kim Newman noted that, while the film was "technically ambitious" and commending some of its visuals, its thin plot, repetitiveness, and unconvincing documentary elements undermined it. Roger Moore of Roger's Movie Nation was highly critical of the film, stating, "Antrum: The Deadliest Film Ever Made isn’t amateurish enough to be charming or professional enough to pull off the con job." Mike Sprague from Joblo rated the film a mixed score of five out of ten, commending the film's intriguing premise, and soundtrack, but also stated that the film did not take full advantage of its premise, and criticized its "amateurish" qualities, and general lack of scares.

References

External links
 Official website
 
 

2018 independent films
2010s mockumentary films
2010s supernatural horror films
2018 films
2018 horror films
Canadian independent films
Canadian multilingual films
Canadian supernatural horror films
Demons in film
Films about curses
Films about films
Films based on urban legends
Films set in forests
Folk horror films
Found footage films
Hell in popular culture
2010s English-language films
2010s Canadian films